Alliou Dembélé (born 1 February 1988) is a French professional footballer who plays as a midfielder for Championnat National club Bourg-en-Bresse.

Club career
On 26 January 2022, Dembélé returned to Bourg-en-Bresse on a 18-months contract.

Personal life 
Born in France, Dembélé is of Malian descent.

Career statistics

References

External links
 

1988 births
Living people
Footballers from Val-d'Oise
French footballers
French sportspeople of Malian descent
Association football midfielders
Paris Saint-Germain F.C. players
Racing Club de France Football players
SAS Épinal players
Gazélec Ajaccio players
US Boulogne players
Football Bourg-en-Bresse Péronnas 01 players
Chamois Niortais F.C. players
AC Ajaccio players
Stade Lavallois players
Stade Briochin players
Championnat National 2 players
Championnat National 3 players
Championnat National players
Ligue 2 players
Sportspeople from Pontoise
Black French sportspeople